NTV Kohalpur is a television channel in Nepal, with a focus on news. The station began broadcasting on 14 April 2017 AD (1st Baisakh 2074 BS).

See also
Nepal Television
List of Nepali television stations

References

External links
  NTV Website

Television channels in Nepal
Television news in Nepal
Television channels and stations established in 2014
2017 establishments in Nepal